Celsius is a small lunar impact crater that is located in the rugged terrain in the southern hemisphere on the Moon's near side. It is named after Swedish astronomer, physicist and mathematician Anders Celsius. It lies less than one crater diameter to the south-southwest of the crater Zagut, and due north of Büsching.

This is a heavily worn crater with a southwest rim that has been damaged by multiple small crater impacts. There is a valley-like gap in the northern rim that joins Celsius with Celsius A. The interior floor of Celsius is almost featureless, except for a small craterlet in the northern half.

Satellite craters

By convention these features are identified on lunar maps by placing the letter on the side of the crater midpoint that is closest to Celsius.

References

 
 
 
 
 
 
 
 
 
 
 

Impact craters on the Moon